Emil Schön (4 August 1872 – 29 November 1945) was a German fencer. He won a gold medal in the team sabre event at the 1906 Intercalated Games.

References

1872 births
1945 deaths
German male fencers
Olympic fencers of Germany
Olympic gold medalists for Germany
Medalists at the 1906 Intercalated Games
Fencers at the 1906 Intercalated Games
Fencers at the 1908 Summer Olympics
Fencers at the 1912 Summer Olympics